

Portugal
 Angola – 
 Miguel Ximenes Rodrigues Sandoval de Castro e Viegas, Governor-General of Angola (1853–1854)
 José Rodrigues Coelho do Amaral, Governor-General of Angola (1854–1860)

United Kingdom
 Malta Colony – William Reid, Governor of Malta (1851–1858)
 New South Wales – Lieutenant Colonel Charles FitzRoy, Governor of New South Wales (1846–1855)
 South Australia – Sir Henry Young, Governor of South Australia (1848–1854)
 Western Australia – Captain Charles Fitzgerald, Governor of Western Australia (1848–1855)

Colonial governors
Colonial governors
1854